Prunus spinulosa is an evergreen species of cherry-laurel native to southeastern China and warmer parts of Japan. Its lustrous leaves superficially resemble those of holly. Individual trees can reach 20m, and are typically found growing in places with high ambient humidity, such as forested areas near larger rivers.

References

spinulosa
Flora of China
Flora of Japan
Plants described in 1845